Independent Citizens' Initiative Save Austria or Save Austria is an inactive anti-EU movement in Austria which was founded by former presidential candidate and pro-neutrality activist Karl Walter Nowak to fight against the European Constitution and the Treaty of Lisbon. In the 2008 Austrian legislative election they received 0.73% of the vote and no seats. Their largest vote - 0.9% - was in Upper Austria.

External links
 Official website
 Zeitwort Forum

Political parties in Austria